Sigmatomera is a genus of crane fly in the family Limoniidae.

Distribution
Southern part of North America, South America & Australasia.

Species
Subgenus Austrolimnobia Alexander, 1922
S. bullocki (Alexander, 1936)
S. magnifica (Alexander, 1913)
S. maiae (Alexander, 1929)
S. plaumanniana Alexander, 1938
S. rarissima Alexander, 1941
S. rufa (Hudson, 1895)
S. spectabilis (Alexander, 1922)
S. victoriae (Alexander, 1924)
S. woytkowskiana Alexander, 1941
Subgenus Eufurina Alexander, 1946
S. rufithorax (Wiedemann, 1828)
Subgenus Sigmatomera Osten Sacken, 1869
S. aequinoctialis Alexander, 1937
S. amazonica Westwood, 1881
S. angustirostris Alexander, 1947
S. apicalis Alexander, 1914
S. beebei Alexander, 1950
S. felix Alexander, 1957
S. flavipennis Osten Sacken, 1873
S. geijskesana Alexander, 1946
S. occulta Alexander, 1914
S. pictipennis Alexander, 1937
S. seguyi Alexander, 1929
S. shannoniana Alexander, 1929
S. varicornis Alexander, 1936

References

Limoniidae
Diptera of Australasia
Diptera of North America
Diptera of South America